The Grammy Lifetime Achievement Award is a special Grammy Award that is awarded by The Recording Academy to "performers who, during their lifetimes, have made creative contributions of outstanding artistic significance to the field of recording."
This award is distinct from the Grammy Hall of Fame Award, which honors specific recordings rather than individuals, and the Grammy Trustees Award, which honors non-performers.

Lifetime Achievement Award recipients
The following individuals have received Lifetime Achievement Awards, listed by year.

References

External links

 Official site

Lifetime Achievement Award
Lifetime achievement awards
Awards established in 1962